Joseph Monninger (born October 28, 1953) is an American writer and Professor of English at Plymouth State University. He lives in Warren, New Hampshire.

In 2021, Monninger, a non-smoker, was diagnosed with terminal lung cancer.

Books 
 1981, The Night Caller
 1982, The Family Man
 1983, The Summer Hunt
 1986, New Jersey
 1987, Second Season
 1991, Incident at Potter's Bridge, as Joe Monninger
 1991, The Viper Tree
 1992, Biology Write Now!, co-written with T. L. Taigen
 1993, Razor's Song
 1995, Mather
 1999, Home Waters: Fishing With an Old Friend
 2001, A Barn in New England: Making a Home on Three Acres
 2007, Two Ton: one fight, one night: Tony Galento v. Joe Louis
 2007, Baby
 2008, The Letters, co-written with Luanne Rice
 2008, Hippie Chick;
 2010, Eternal on the Water
 2010, Wish
 2011, Finding Somewhere
 2011, The World as We Know It
 2012, Margaret from Maine
 2014 The Major's Daughter, as J.P. Francis
 2014, Stay Alive: Crash
2014, Stay Alive: Cave-In
2014, Stay Alive: Breakdown
2014, Stay Alive: Flood
 2015 Whippoorwill
 2017 The Map That Leads to You, as J. P. Monninger
 2017 Game Change
 2019 Seven Letters'', as J. P. Monninger

See also

References

Sources 
 Interview at Peace Corps Writers
 Faculty profile at Plymouth State University

External links 
 

American academics of English literature
American young adult novelists
American fishers
Angling writers
20th-century American novelists
21st-century American novelists
American male novelists
1953 births
Living people
20th-century American male writers
21st-century American male writers
People from Warren, New Hampshire
20th-century American non-fiction writers
21st-century American non-fiction writers
American male non-fiction writers